Steven "Steve" L. Heston is an American mathematician, economist, and financier. He's also prominently active in the field of gambling-related research, where he sometimes uses the pen name Kim Lee.

Education
Steve Heston studied Mathematics and Economics at the University of Maryland, wherefrom he obtained his B.S. In 1985, he completed his M.B.A. studies in Industrial Administration at the Carnegie Mellon University's Graduate School of Industrial Administration. From the same university, Carnegie Mellon, in 1987, he received his M.S. in Finance and in 1990 his Ph.D.

Academic career
Heston was at the Yale School of Organization and Management from 1989 until 1993, a Visiting Assistant Professor of Finance at the Columbia Business School until 1994, and  Assistant Professor of Finance at the Washington University in St. Louis until 1998.

He is currently, and since 2002, Professor of Finance at the University of Maryland, at  College Park.

Career in finance
Heston is known  for analyzing options with stochastic volatility.

From 1998 to 2002, Heston worked as Vice President of U.S. Arbitrage and also of Quantitative Equities, in Goldman Sachs, New York.

Heston is the originator of the eponymous Heston model, a mathematical formulation describing the evolution of an underlying asset's volatility.

Gambling-related research 
Steve Heston, under his own name or the pen name "Kim Lee," has written extensively on issues related to the games of poker and casino blackjack, and gambling-related issues, in general. He is also active in online message boards on issues related to the mathematics of gambling.

Heston is the author of numerous articles and texts  on the game of blackjack, often participating in teams' strategy formulation, on issues ranging from simple card counting and bankroll management to more advanced advantage-techniques.

Heston is co-author of two highly praised books on tournament poker: Along with Blair Rodman and Lee Nelson, of Kill Phil, and, with Lee Nelson and professional poker tournament player Tysen Streib, of the subsequent Kill Everyone. The titles are a word play combining the title of the Quentin Tarantino movie Kill Bill and the name of Phil Hellmuth, professional poker player and winner of multiple tournaments, with a significant number of WSOP bracelets.

References

External links
University of Maryland official website

American economists
American financiers
Tepper School of Business alumni
University of Maryland, College Park alumni
American essayists
American poker players
American gambling writers
Year of birth missing (living people)
Living people
Washington University in St. Louis faculty
Washington University in St. Louis mathematicians
Financial economists